This is a list of ducal titles created by the monarchs of France. See also French nobility, Dukes in France, Peerage of France, List of French peers, List of French peerages.

Sources
 http://www.heraldica.org/topics/france

French dukedoms